Silver Beach is a summer village in Alberta, Canada. It is located on the eastern shore of Pigeon Lake, west from Wetaskiwin.

Demographics 

In the 2016 Census of Population conducted by Statistics Canada, the Summer Village of Silver Beach had a population of 65 living in 31 of its 100 total private dwellings, a  change from its 2011 population of 52.

See also 
List of communities in Alberta
List of summer villages in Alberta
List of resort villages in Saskatchewan

References

External links 

1953 establishments in Alberta
Summer villages in Alberta